The men's light middleweight event was part of the boxing programme at the 1976 Summer Olympics. The weight class allowed boxers of up to 71 kilograms to compete. The competition was held from 22 to 31 July 1976. 23 boxers from 23 nations competed.

Medalists

Results
The following boxers took part in the event:

First round
 Robert Davies (GBR) def. Wayne Devlin (AUS), KO-2
 Alfredo Lemus (VEN) def. Mohamed Dawuda (GHA), walk-over
 Pierangelo Pira (ITA) def. Ekue Gogli (TOG), walk-over
 Viktor Savchenko (URS) def. John Odhiambo (UGA), walk-over
 Earl Liburd (VIS) def. Mohamed Majeri (TUN), walk-over
 Rolando Garbey (CUB) def. Dashnian Olzwoi (MGL), KO-3
 Leo Vainonen (SWE) def. Jorge Amparo (DOM), 4:1
 Kalevi Kosunen (FIN) def. Juan Scassino (URU), 4:1
 Mohamed Azarhazin (IRN) def. Franz Dorfer (AUT), 4:1
 Tadija Kačar (YUG) def. Poul Frandsen (DEN), 5:0
 Vasile Didea (ROM) def. Michael Prevost (CAN), DSQ-3
 Nayden Stanchev (BUL) def. Steven Moi (KEN), walk-over

Second round
 Jerzy Rybicki (POL) def. Chuck Walker (USA), 3:2
 Wilfredo Guzmán (PUR) def. Brian Byrne (IRL), 3:2
 Alfredo Lemus (VEN) def. Robert Davies (GBR), 4:1
 Viktor Savchenko (URS) def. Pierangelo Pira (ITA), KO-2
 Rolando Garbey (CUB) def. Earl Liburd (VIS), RSC-2
 Kalevi Kosunen (FIN) def. Leo Vainonen (SWE), 4:1
 Tadija Kačar (YUG) def. Mohamed Azarhazin (IRN), 5:0
 Vasile Didea (ROM) def. Nayden Stanchev (BUL), 5:0

Quarterfinals
 Jerzy Rybicki (POL) def. Wilfredo Guzmán (PUR), 5:0
 Viktor Savchenko (URS) def. Alfredo Lemus (VEN), KO-2
 Rolando Garbey (CUB) def. Kalevi Kosunen (FIN), RSC-1
 Tadija Kačar (YUG) def. Vasile Didea (ROM), 5:0

Semifinals
 Jerzy Rybicki (POL) def. Viktor Savchenko (URS), 3:2
 Tadija Kačar (YUG) def. Rolando Garbey (CUB), 4:1

Final
 Jerzy Rybicki (POL) def. Tadija Kačar (YUG), 5:0

References

Light Middleweight